Kruszyn may refer to the following places in Poland:
Kruszyn, Lower Silesian Voivodeship (south-west Poland)
Kruszyn, Bydgoszcz County in Kuyavian-Pomeranian Voivodeship (north-central Poland)
Kruszyn, Włocławek County in Kuyavian-Pomeranian Voivodeship (north-central Poland)
Kruszyn, Podlaskie Voivodeship (north-east Poland)
Kruszyn, Pomeranian Voivodeship (north Poland)